This is a list of notable  scorewriter software for creating and editing tablature notation for guitar and other fretted instruments.

 Finale
 G7, part of Sibelius
 Guitar Pro
 LilyPond
 MagicScore/Maestro
 Mozart the music processor
 MuseScore
 MusicEase
 MusEdit
 Notion and Progression, a smaller version of Notion, specially for guitar
 Power Tab Editor
 TuxGuitar

History

 
The first tablature program was written for the Amstrad CPC 464 in 1986. "Tab Composer CPC" was implemented in Locomotive BASIC 1.0. It offered a multi-page graphical WYSIWYG, 3channel polyphonic playback and volume and tone envelope functionality, as well as save and load. BASIC programs could be generated for direct playback without the program as well, facilitating easy integration of the created musical content into other programs such as games. The user interface was in German only. 

An attempt was made to publish the program as a type-in listing in the German  magazine. The program was rejected mainly due to poor (handwritten) documentation, and a tedious user interface. The author is still in possession of the original correspondence with the Happy Computer editorial staff, including the letter of rejection.

See also
 Comparison of MIDI editors and sequencers
 List of scorewriters
 List of music software

External links
 

Guitar tablature software